Chungnyeolsa is a sacred shrine, where the spirits of those who fought against the Japanese troops during the Japanese invasions of Korea of 1592, are enshrined.

The present Chungnyeolsa was first built in 1605 (the 38th year of the reign under King Seonjo) as Songgongsa, within the South Gate of Dongnae eupseong by Yun Hwon, the Deputy Delegate of Dongnae, enshrining  Song Sang-hyeon and performing annual rite to the spirit. Then, in 1624 (the 2nd year of the reign under King Injo), with the suggestion of Lee Min-goo, the name of the temple was changed to Chungnyeolsa, also enshrining the spirit of Jeong Bal, a patriot who died a heroic death at Busanjin Fortress.

Then, in 1625 (the 3rd year of the reign under King Injo), Chungnyeolsa was moved to the current location, and named Allak Seowon with the construction of an auditorium and Dongseojae, in order to pass the loyalty and the academic conducts of the ancestors, serving both the functions of a temple house and a library.

In 1709 (the 35th year of the reign under King Sukjong), a separate building was built at the original location of Songgongsa, in memory of Jo Yeong-gyu (the Country Governor of Yangsan-gun), No Gae-bang (the Dongnae Kyosoo), Mun Deok-gyeom (a Confucian scholar), Yang Jo-han, Song Bong-su (the Bijang), Kim Hui-soo (the Military Commander), Sin Yeo-ro (a steward), Song Baek (the Hyangni) and Kim Sang (a common man), etc., all of whom dies bravely with Song Sang-hyeon and Jeong Bal.

In 1736 (the 12th year of the reign under King Yeongjo), the ones enshrined at the separate buildings were all enshrined together at Chungnyeolsa, and in 1772 (the 48th year of the reign under King Yeongjo), Yun Heung-sin, the Dadaecheomsa, was also enshrined here, while a sanctuary was built outside the East Gate of Chungnyeolsa, in memory of Geumseom and Aehyang, each of whom died after Song Sang-hyeon and Jeong Bal.

Chungnyeolsa went through more remodeling and restoration thereafter, and is currently composed of 16 buildings including the main hall in a total area of 93,448 m2. Approximately 92 memorial tablets are enshrined in memory of those who died bravely and patriotically in Busan region, fighting against the Japanese troops. A sacrificial rite is performed on May 25 annually, with the gratitude and the hearts of the citizens of Busan Metropolitan City.

References

Shrines